Dioctria atricapilla, the violet black-legged robber fly, is a species of robber fly in the subfamily Dasypogoninae. This 9- to 12-millimeter long insect has a wingspan of roughly 7 to 9 mm and short, three-segmented antennae. It's a predatory insect, feeding mainly on smaller flies and predatory hymenopterans. It primarily thrives in grassland, and is seen from May to July.

Habitat and behavior
Like all robber flies, the violet black-legged robber fly feed by perching on lower stems of grasses and attack prey as it flies by. The larvae usually grow up in dung piles or decaying organic matter, but they can also be in regular soil.

Courting behavior involves the male leading the courtship dance in front of the female. If she isn't impressed, she'll rapidly move her wings or fly away; otherwise the male will begin copulating.

Natural status
There are 24 locations in the United Kingdom where it's a protected species, mostly in England. It can be found throughout European and east Palearctic grasslands.

References

Asilidae
Brachyceran flies of Europe
Insects described in 1804
Articles containing video clips